Wayne Crouse (16 December 1924 - 19 May 2000) was the viola professor emeritus at the University of Oklahoma and principal violist of the Oklahoma City Philharmonic from 1982 until his death from cancer at the age of 75.

During the war he served in the U.S. Air Force.
Crouse graduated from the Juilliard School in 1951, where he studied with Milton Katims, Ivan Galamian, and Dorothy DeLay. In his debut Juilliard concert, he played the violin, but he was encouraged to switch to the viola.  He served as the principal violist of the Houston Symphony for 28 of his 32 years there, during which he performed the Walton Viola Concerto under the direction of Sir William Walton three times in January 1969. Crouse was also violist in the Lyric Art Quartet at the University of Houston, the Virtuoso Quartet, and the Shepherd Quartet at Rice University, where he taught for some time.

Later in his life, he taught at University of Oklahoma and was the principal violist of the Oklahoma City Philharmonic.

The new Wayne Crouse Quartet, a student performance group that was formed in his honor, was in residence at the University of Houston beginning in Fall 2000.

References

American classical violists
Musicians from Oklahoma City
Juilliard School alumni
University of Oklahoma faculty
University of Houston faculty
Rice University faculty
1924 births
2000 deaths
Musicians from Houston
20th-century classical musicians
20th-century American musicians
Classical musicians from Texas
20th-century violists